Street Transvestite Action Revolutionaries (STAR) was a  gay, gender non-conforming and transvestite street activist organization founded in 1970 by Sylvia Rivera and Marsha P. Johnson, subculturally-famous New York City drag queens of color. STAR was a radical political collective that also provided housing and support to homeless LGBT youth and sex workers in Lower Manhattan. Rivera and Johnson were the "mothers" of the household, and funded the organization largely through sex work. STAR is considered by many to be a groundbreaking organization in the queer liberation movement and a model for other organizations.

History

Origin 
Both founders were long-term civil rights activists, and were present during the 1969 Stonewall riots and the intense period of gay organizing that began in the wake of Stonewall.

On September 20, 1970, a sit-in protest was staged at Weinstein Hall of New York University after the administration cancelled planned dances there. Reportedly, The Christopher Street Liberation Day Committee, who were organizers of the first Gay Pride Parade, held on the first anniversary of the  Stonewall riots, coordinated a series of four dances, to be held at Weinstein Hall as fundraisers for legal, medical and housing services for the gay community. The "Dance-a-Fairs" were booked with the Weinstein Hall Student Governing Association and it was later speculated that administration canceled the later dances because a gay organization was sponsoring the events. The sit-in was held by NYU Gay Student Liberation, Gay Liberation Front (GLF), Radicalesbians and other activists.

Over the course of the five day sit-in, during which time activists planned and networked extensively among themselves, Rivera first got the idea for what would eventually become STAR House. During the final day of the sit-in, the activists were forcibly removed by riot police. After their removal, activists gathered on the steps of Weinstein Hall. Rivera and other homeless trans activists were the last to disperse, after other activists had abandoned the demonstration. Soon after Rivera published a flyer titled "GAY POWER-WHEN DO WE WANT IT? OR DO WE?" under the name Street Transvestites for Gay Power, which was critical of those unwilling to fight for "Gay Power", and of police abuse of gay individuals.

Official formation and STAR House 
STAR was officially founded after the Weinstein Hall sit-ins. Initially Rivera wanted Johnson to be the president of STAR, but Johnson declined, saying the offer was flattering, but that someone who thought in a more linear manner, and who was better at long-term planning, would be better for the job. In addition to holding meetings and attending demonstrations during this time, STAR sought to provide housing for homeless trans and gay youth.

Both Rivera and Johnson were often homeless themselves. When they were able to rent a hotel room or an apartment, they would sneak homeless friends into their rooms - sometimes up to 50 at a time.

Together with the GLF, STAR hosted a fundraising dance on November 21, 1970, and with these funds they were able to purchase STAR House. They found a 4-bedroom apartment in a run-down building at 213 East 2nd Street, in the East Village in New York. The apartment had no electricity or heat, but they began working to repair it. Rivera and Johnson used to hustle the streets in order to keep everyone fed and sheltered, and to keep "their kids" (the runaways they took in) from having to do the same. This STAR house was only active until July 1971.

Further activism and decline 
After the end of STAR House, STAR began to shift its focus towards achieving recognition for trans individuals within the gay liberationist movement, and in society at large. Their next large action was to join other activists in the campaign for Intro 475, a municipal bill which Gay Activists Alliance helped introduce, and which sought protections against sexual orientation discrimination. Members of STAR and Queens Liberation Front criticized GAA for ignoring protections for trans individuals, which they believed was an intentional move to ensure the bill's passage. During the course of hearings for Intro 475, Rivera read a statement concerning the physical abuse of and denial of housing to trans individuals.

In 1972 STAR stopped holding meetings, and saw a decline in demonstrations. While STAR had no official termination date, Rivera marks the 1973 Christopher Street Liberation Day Parade as the death of STAR. Believing that gender nonconforming individuals, the STAR contingent, and drag queens in particular were intentionally being asked to stay at the back of the march and off the stage,  Rivera and fellow queen Lee Brewster stormed the stage during feminist activist Jean O'Leary of Lesbian Feminist Liberation's speech. They jumped onstage and Rivera shouted "You go to bars because of what drag queens did for you, and these bitches tell us to quit being ourselves!"  Rivera took the microphone and criticized other gay liberationist activists for their assimilationist agenda, especially their lack of concern for their incarcerated brothers and sisters, who in seeking help from the community, "do not write women. They do not write men. They write to STAR." Rivera then led a chant for "Gay power". Jean O'Leary then resumed speaking and criticized drag as misogynist and demeaning. Lee Brewster of Queens Liberation Front followed O'Leary, criticizing lesbians who sought to exclude trans individuals from the gay liberation movement.

For Rivera, O'Leary's comments represented a gay liberationist movement which had increasingly come to exclude queens and gender nonconforming individuals. After the rally Rivera chose to leave the movement for years, moving to upstate New York.

Resurrection 
Following the June 20th, 2000, murder of Amanda Milan, Rivera briefly "resurrected" STAR on January 6, 2001 under the new name Street Transgender Action Revolutionaries. After being honored in Italy, Rivera continued to work to advance the fight for the transgender civil rights bill in New York City and State and to fight for self-determination for all gender non-conformists.

Political Ideology 
Sylvia Rivera and Marsha P. Johnson were outspoken about their insistence for freedom. The members of STAR wrote a manifesto in 1970 outlining the group's political ideology and demands, in which they identify themselves as a revolutionary army opposed to the system. The Manifesto condemns homophobia, racism, targeted incarceration, police harassment, and the predatory behavior of men in prison against the gender nonconforming and gay prisoners who write to STAR. Among their demands are the right to self-determination, and an end to job discrimination and street harassment. The Manifesto exhibits a socialist and third gender perspective, with its demands for free education, healthcare, food and social services for all oppressed peoples, and language that distinguishes the members of STAR from either the gay men's or the women's communities of the time. From Rivera and Johnson's perspectives, personal freedom was not only dependent on their own individual rights, but on the liberation of all oppressed peoples.

Later activism by founders
Johnson was later an activist and organizer with ACT-UP. In 1992, Johnson's body was found in the Hudson River, off the Christopher Street docks, under suspicious circumstances. While Johnson's death was initially dismissed by the police as a suicide, friends, family, and several witnesses believe Johnson was murdered. Pressure from the public has led to the case being reopened.

As the mainstream of the gay community became more assimilationist, Rivera in particular often found herself at odds with New York pride parade organizers and other mainstream LGBT groups that practiced "respectability politics" or who saw drag as misogynist. Despite mainstream opposition, Rivera continued to press for the inclusion of trans, and all gender-nonconforming people, in LGBT organizations and legislation. After living in upstate New York for many years, Rivera returned to New York City after Johnson's death, again living for a time at the "gay pier" at Christopher Street docks, and working to organize and support homeless people, especially those with AIDS and substance abuse issues.

Rivera died of liver cancer in 2002.

Legacy
In 1995, Rusty Mae Moore and Chelsea Goodwin, inspired by STAR House, created their own household and shelter called Transy House, where Sylvia Rivera would eventually live once returning to New York City after Marsha Johnson's death.

In an interview in the 2012 documentary, Pay It No Mind: The Life & Times of Marsha P. Johnson, Johnson credits Rivera with founding STAR, and Johnson and friends discuss the work accomplished by the group.

In 2013, Untorelli Press published Street Transvestite Action Revolutionaries: Survival, Revolt, and Queer Antagonist Struggle, a collection of historical documents, interviews, and critical analyses relating to STAR.

See also

LGBT history
LGBT rights in the United States
List of LGBT rights organizations
 Equal (TV series)

References

External links
 - Sylvia Rivera represents STAR at Gay Liberation Rally, New York City, 1973
 - documentary and interview 
 - extensive interview

Transgender organizations in the United States
Defunct LGBT organizations based in New York City
LGBT political advocacy groups in New York (state)
LGBT and homelessness
1970 in LGBT history
1970 establishments in New York City
Organizations established in 1970